is a Japanese anime series that serves as a chibi-style crossover between the light novel series KonoSuba, Overlord, Re:Zero − Starting Life in Another World, and The Saga of Tanya the Evil, all published by Kadokawa Corporation. The series aired its first season from April to June 2019. A second season aired from January to March 2020, including additional characters from  The Rising of the Shield Hero and Cautious Hero: The Hero Is Overpowered but Overly Cautious.  An anime film titled Isekai Quartet The Movie -Another World- was released in June 2022.  A third season has been announced.

Plot
One day, a magic button suddenly appears. The protagonists from KonoSuba, Overlord, Re:Zero − Starting Life in Another World, and Saga of Tanya the Evil all press the button occasionally, unintentionally and move to a parallel world — another brand new isekai — where a new story featuring high school life begins. Soon, they are joined by protagonists from The Rising of the Shield Hero and Cautious Hero: The Hero Is Overpowered but Overly Cautious.

Characters

Production and release

The series is written and directed by Minoru Ashina, with character designs by Minoru Takehara, who also serves as chief animation director. The series is animated by Studio Puyukai. It aired from April 9 to June 25, 2019. The series ran 12 episodes. Funimation (now Crunchyroll, LLC) has licensed the series and is streaming it in both Japanese and English. On April 23, 2019, it was added to Crunchyroll's streaming library as well. Satoshi Hino, Jun Fukushima, Yūsuke Kobayashi and Aoi Yūki perform the opening theme song , while Yumi Hara, Sora Amamiya, Rie Takahashi and Aoi Yūki perform the ending theme song .

A second season of the anime series was announced at the ending of Episode 12 and premiered on January 14, 2020. The main staff members returned to reprise their roles. The season includes guest appearances of characters from The Rising of the Shield Hero. Hino, Fukushima, Kobayashi and Yūki perform the second season's opening theme song , while Sumire Uesaka, Rie Takahashi, Inori Minase, and Saori Hayami perform the second season's ending theme song, . The second season ran for 12 episodes. Funimation has licensed the series for a simuldub. Crunchyroll is also streaming the second season. Muse Communication is streaming the second season in Southeast Asia and South Asia on its Muse Asia YouTube channel.

A sequel to the anime series was announced at the ending of the second season's final episode. A new anime film titled Isekai Quartet The Movie -Another World- has been announced, with the returning staff and cast. The film premiered on June 10, 2022. The film's theme song is "Melodic Road Movie" by Konomi Suzuki featuring Kashitarō Itō.

A side-scrolling action game, Pixel Game Maker Series Isekai Quartet: Adventure Action Game, has been released for Nintendo Switch and Steam on July 17th, 2021.

Reception
Gadget Tsūshin listed "beautiful Megumin" in their 2019 anime buzzwords list.

Notes

References

External links
  
 
 

2019 anime television series debuts
2022 anime films
Comedy anime and manga
Crossover anime and manga
Metafictional television series
Crunchyroll anime
Funimation
Isekai anime and manga
KonoSuba
Muse Communication
Re:Zero
School life in anime and manga
Studio Puyukai
Tokyo MX original programming
Upcoming anime television series